Georg Scholl (24 October 1751 – 17 May 1831) was a gardener at Schönbrunn Palace in Vienna.

Scholl was born in Weilbach, Bavaria.

Career
He was sent by Emperor Joseph II as assistant to gardener-botanist Franz Boos to collect specimens for the royal garden and cabinet on a collecting trip to the Cape of South Africa. Arriving at the end of May 1786, he completed a few short collecting trips with Scotsman Francis Masson and commissar Robert Jacob Gordon, these becoming longer over the next few months, the itineraries being unknown. Scholl was left at the Cape when Boos left for the Mascarene Islands on 18 February 1787. He returned a year later with so much material that it could not be transported in a single consignment. Boos sailed for Europe on 5 February 1788. Scholl remained at the Cape for another 14 years before returning to Europe. Much of this time Masson was also at the Cape and in correspondence to Joseph Banks pointed out the difficulties of getting transport for their collections. From the collections it seems that Boos and Scholl, or Scholl alone, collected as far north as Namaqualand and east to Kaffraria. From a horticulture stand point, the collections greatly enriched the gardens at Schönbrunn Palace and much of their new material was described and beautifully illustrated in the work of botanist Jacquin.

Scholl died in Vienna.

See also
 List of gardener-botanist explorers of the Enlightenment
 European and American voyages of scientific exploration

References

Sources

Further reading
Vernon Siegfried Forbes: Pioneer Travellers in South Africa. A. A. Balkema, Cape Town 1965
, J. S. Afr. Bot. 8: 201–224, 1942
: Park und Garten von Schönbrunn, Amalthea, Vienna (2003)

External links
 Biography, Österreichisches Biographisches Lexikon 1815–1950 (in German)
 Plantarum Rariorum Horti Caesarei Schoenbrunnensis (4 volumes, 1797–1804), Nikolaus von Jaquin's catalogue of plants held in the collections at the Schönbrunn Palace of Emperor Joseph II in Vienna between 1797 and 1804.

1751 births
1831 deaths
German explorers
German horticulturists
19th-century Austrian botanists
18th-century Austrian botanists